Höing is a German surname. Notable people with the surname include:

Bernd Höing (born 1955), German rower
Jens Höing (born 1987), German racing driver

German-language surnames